Steve Stacey is an Australian former rugby league footballer who played in the 1980s.

Biography
Steve Stacey made only two appearances for Queensland, scoring a try in the 1983 series.

External links
 Queensland representatives at qrl.com.au

1958 births
Australian rugby league players
Eastern Suburbs Tigers players
Queensland Rugby League State of Origin players
Living people
Rugby league wingers